The Ecluse Saint-Pierre is one of two locks on the Canal de Brienne.

External links
 360 degree rotating image
 Photo

References

Locks of France